How to Train Your Dragon is a 2010 American computer-animated action fantasy film loosely based on the 2003 book of the same name by Cressida Cowell, produced by DreamWorks Animation and distributed by Paramount Pictures. It was directed by Chris Sanders and Dean DeBlois from a screenplay by Will Davies, Sanders, and DeBlois, and stars the voices of Jay Baruchel, Gerard Butler, Craig Ferguson, America Ferrera, Jonah Hill, Christopher Mintz-Plasse, T.J. Miller, and Kristen Wiig. The story takes place in Berk, a mythical Viking village; Hiccup, an undersized teen wishing to become a dragon slayer like the other Vikings, injures a rare Night Fury dragon but is unable to bring himself to kill it. He instead helps and befriends the dragon, and quickly discovers that things are not exactly as they seem in the Viking-Dragon conflict.

In 2004, the book series began attracting the attention of the executives at DreamWorks Animation. Following the success of Over the Hedge (2006), producer Bonnie Arnold shortly became interested in the newly acquired property. The filmmakers hired cinematographer Roger Deakins (known for frequently collaborating with the Coen brothers) as a visual consultant to help them with lighting and overall look of the film and to add a live-action feel. John Powell composed the film's musical score.

How to Train Your Dragon premiered at the Gibson Amphitheater on March 21, 2010, and was released in the United States five days later on March 26. The film was a commercial success, earning nearly $500 million worldwide. It was widely acclaimed, being praised for its animation, voice acting, writing, musical score, and 3D sequences. It was nominated for the Academy Award for Best Animated Feature and Best Original Score at the 83rd Academy Awards, but lost to Toy Story 3 and The Social Network, respectively. How to Train Your Dragon also won ten Annie Awards, including Best Animated Feature. How to Train Your Dragon is the first entry in what would become the multimedia franchise of the same name, which includes two more films—How to Train Your Dragon 2 (2014) and How to Train Your Dragon: The Hidden World (2019). A live-action reboot from Universal Pictures is scheduled to be released on March 14, 2025.

Plot  
The Viking village of Berk is frequently attacked by dragons, which steal livestock and endanger the villagers. Hiccup, the awkward 15-year-old son of the village chieftain, Stoick the Vast, is deemed too weak to fight the dragons. Instead, he creates mechanical devices under his apprenticeship with Gobber, the village blacksmith, though Hiccup's inventions often backfire. Hiccup uses a bolas launcher to shoot down a Night Fury, a rare and dangerous dragon, but cannot bring himself to kill the creature and sets him free.

Before leaving with his fleet to find and destroy the dragons' nest, Stoick enters Hiccup in a dragon-fighting class taught by Gobber with fellow teenagers Fishlegs, Snotlout, twins Ruffnut and Tuffnut, and Astrid, on whom Hiccup has a crush. Failing in training, Hiccup returns to the forest and finds the Night Fury trapped in a cove, unable to fly because Hiccup's bolas tore off half his tail fin. Hiccup gradually befriends the dragon, naming him 'Toothless' after his retractable teeth, and designs a harness and prosthetic fin allowing Toothless to fly with Hiccup riding him.

Learning dragon behavior from Toothless, Hiccup is able to subdue the captive dragons during training, earning admiration from his peers but suspicion from Astrid. Stoick's fleet returns home unsuccessful, though he is gladdened by Hiccup's unexpected success in dragon training. Hiccup is judged the winner of his training class and must kill a dragon for his final exam. He tries to run away with Toothless, but Astrid ambushes him in the forest and discovers the dragon. Hiccup takes Astrid for a sunset flight to demonstrate that Toothless is friendly, but Toothless is hypnotically drawn to the dragons' nest. There, a gargantuan dragon named the Red Death summons the smaller dragons to feed it live food to avoid being eaten themselves. Realizing the dragons have been forced to attack Berk to survive, Astrid wishes to tell the village, but Hiccup advises against it to protect Toothless.

In his final exam, Hiccup faces a captive Monstrous Nightmare dragon and tries to subdue him to prove that dragons can be peaceful. When Stoick inadvertently angers the dragon into attacking, Toothless escapes the cove to protect Hiccup but is captured by the Vikings. After Hiccup accidentally reveals that Toothless knows the location of the dragons' nest, Stoick ignores his son's warnings about the Red Death and disowns him, setting off for the nest with Toothless chained to the lead ship as a guide. Hiccup is devastated, but Astrid prompts him to realize that he spared Toothless out of compassion, not weakness. Regaining his confidence, Hiccup shows Astrid and their friends how to befriend the training dragons, and they set out after Toothless.

Stoick and his Vikings locate and break open the dragon's nest, awakening the Red Death, which soon overwhelms them. Hiccup, Astrid, and their friends fly in on the training dragons, distracting the Red Death. Hiccup attempts to free Toothless from the damaged ship; the two nearly drown, but Stoick rescues them, reconciling with his son. Toothless and Hiccup lure the Red Death into a dive before firing a fireball down its throat, killing it. In the ensuing explosion, Toothless shields Hiccup, but Hiccup loses his lower left leg and faints. 

Awakening sometime later, Hiccup finds that Gobber has fashioned him a prosthetic, and he is now admired by his village, including Astrid, who kisses him. Berk begins a new era of humans and dragons living in harmony.

Voice cast 
 Jay Baruchel – Hiccup Horrendous Haddock III, the awkward son of Stoick the Vast. 
 America Ferrera – Astrid Hofferson, Hiccup's fellow student in dragon training and his love interest. 
 Gerard Butler – Stoick the Vast, the chieftain of Berk and Hiccup's father.
 Craig Ferguson – Gobber the Belch, Berk's blacksmith, a close friend of Stoick's and teacher of the tribe's young dragon-training recruits.
 Christopher Mintz-Plasse – Fishlegs Ingerman, an enthusiastic youth knowledgeable in dragon lore which he often relates in role-playing game style.
 Jonah Hill – Snotlout Jorgenson, one of Hiccup's dragon-training classmates. Snotlout is brash, overconfident, and fairly unintelligent, but reliable.
 T.J. Miller and Kristen Wiig – Tuffnut and Ruffnut Thorston, a pair of quarrelsome twins.
 David Tennant – Spitelout, Snotlout's father.
 Robin Atkin Downes – Ack, a blond-bearded Viking.
 Philip McGrade – Starkard.
 Kieron Elliott – Hoark the Haggard, a Viking with a knotted beard.
 Ashley Jensen – Phlegma the Fierce, a female Viking.
 Randy Thom – vocal effects for Toothless the Night Fury.

Production 

The book series by Cressida Cowell began coming to attention to the executives at DreamWorks Animation in 2004. Coming off her success in Over the Hedge, producer Bonnie Arnold shortly became interested in the newly acquired property. She kept focusing on the project as time went on, and when DreamWorks Animation co-president of production Bill Damaschke asked her what she wanted to work on next, she chose "How to Train Your Dragon".

During initial development, the plot followed the original novel closely, but about halfway through production Chris Sanders and Dean DeBlois, previously the writers and directors of Disney's Lilo & Stitch, took over as co-directors and it was altered. The original plot has been described by DeBlois as "heavily loyal to the book," but was regarded as being too "sweet" and "whimsical" and geared to a younger demographic. In the novel, Hiccup's dragon, Toothless, is believed to be a Common or Garden Dragon, a small breed. In the film, Toothless is an injured Night Fury, the rarest species of all dragons, far faster, aerodynamic and more powerful than the other species, and is large enough to serve as a flying mount for both Hiccup and Astrid. The filmmakers hired cinematographer Roger Deakins (known for frequently collaborating with the Coen brothers) as a visual consultant to help them with lighting and overall look of the film and to "add a live-action feel". Extensive research was done to depict both flight, as the directors knew they would be the biggest draw of the film's 3D effects, and fire, given animation could break away from the limitations seen in live-action films, where propane flames are usual due to being easier to extinguish. The dragons' designers made sure to create animals that were comical and also innovative compared to other dragon fiction. Toothless in particular tried to combine various dragon traits in a black panther-inspired design, that also had large ears and eyes to convey emotion better.

The directors made sure to cash in the improvisation abilities of the secondary cast—Christopher Mintz-Plasse, Jonah Hill, Kristen Wiig and T.J Miller—by frequently bringing them together in the recording sessions.

Music 

John Powell returned to DreamWorks Animation to score How to Train Your Dragon, making it his sixth collaboration with the studio, following Antz, The Road to El Dorado, Chicken Run, Shrek, and his previous score for Kung Fu Panda (all of which he scored with either Harry Gregson-Williams and/or Hans Zimmer). Powell composed an orchestral score, combining bombastic brass with loud percussion and soothing strings, while also using exotic Scottish and Irish tones with instruments like the penny whistle and bagpipes. Additionally, Icelandic singer Jónsi wrote and performed the song "Sticks & Stones" for the film. The score was released by Varèse Sarabande on March 23, 2010.

Overall, the score was well received by film score critics. Powell earned his first Academy Award nomination for his work on the film, ultimately losing to Trent Reznor and Atticus Ross for their score for The Social Network.

Release

Theatrical 
How to Train Your Dragon had its United States premiere on March 21, 2010 at the Gibson Amphitheatre in Universal City, California, and was theatrically released on March 26, 2010 in the United States. It was originally scheduled for release on November 20, 2009, but was pushed back to avoid competition with other family films released in November. The film was digitally re-mastered into IMAX 3D, and released to 186 North American IMAX theatres, and approximately 80 IMAX theatres outside North America.

A month before the release, DreamWorks Animation CEO Jeffrey Katzenberg protested Warner Bros.' decision to convert Clash of the Titans from 2D to 3D, then to release it one week after How to Train Your Dragon. Entertainment reporter Kim Masters described the 3D release schedule around March 2010 as a "traffic jam", and speculated that the lack of 3D screen availability could hurt Katzenberg's prospects despite his support of the 3D format. That month, theater industry executives accused Paramount Pictures (who distributed the film on behalf of DreamWorks) of using high-pressure tactics to coerce theaters to screen How to Train Your Dragon rather than competing 3D releases, Clash of the Titans and Tim Burton's Alice in Wonderland. As theater multiplexes often had just one 3D screen, theaters were unable to accommodate more than one 3D presentation at a time.

Home media 
How to Train Your Dragon was released on single-disc DVD, two-disc double DVD pack and Blu-ray/DVD combo pack editions in Canada and the United States on October 15, 2010. Among the features available in the two-disc DVD edition and Blu-ray is an original sequel short film, Legend of the Boneknapper Dragon. As of February 2012, 9.7 million home entertainment units were sold worldwide. The film was reissued on Blu-ray on May 27, 2014, with the short film Book of Dragons and an episode of DreamWorks Dragons added as additional bonus features.

In July 2014, the film's distribution rights were purchased by DreamWorks Animation from Paramount Pictures and transferred to 20th Century Fox before reverting to Universal Studios in 2018. As a result, Universal Pictures Home Entertainment released a 4K Ultra HD Blu-ray version of the film on January 22, 2019 alongside the film's sequel How to Train Your Dragon 2, making them the first DreamWorks Animation catalog titles to be released on that format, and in preparation for the release of How to Train Your Dragon: The Hidden World the following month.

Reception

Box office 
How to Train Your Dragon topped the North American box office with $43.7 million in its first weekend of release. The film grossed $217.6 million in the United States and Canada and $277.3 million in foreign countries with a worldwide total of $494.9 million. How to Train Your Dragon is DreamWorks Animation's highest-grossing film in the American and Canadian box office other than the Shrek films. It is the fifth-highest-grossing animated film of 2010, behind Toy Story 3 with $1,063.2 million, Shrek Forever After with $752.6 million, Tangled with $576.6 million, and Despicable Me with $543.1 million and the 10th-highest-grossing movie of 2010. , the How to Train Your Dragon series has grossed over $1 billion worldwide.

Critical response 
How to Train Your Dragon was widely praised upon its release. The website's critical consensus states, "Boasting dazzling animation, a script with surprising dramatic depth, and thrilling 3-D sequences, How to Train Your Dragon soars." The film is DreamWorks Animation's highest-rated film on the Rotten Tomatoes website. On Metacritic, the film has a weighted average score of 75 out of 100 based on 37 reviews from critics, indicating "generally favorable reviews". Audiences polled by CinemaScore gave the film an average grade of "A" on an A+ to F scale.

Matt Risley of Variety wrote a highly positive review, hailing it as "undoubtedly Dreamworks' best film yet, and quite probably the best dragon movie ever made". James Berardinelli of ReelViews gave it 3.5 out of 4 stars, and complimented both the "technically proficient" animation and the "witty, intelligent, surprisingly insightful script". Claudia Puig of USA Today noted that the film had "surprising depth", and praised the "sweetly poignant tale of friendship between man and animal". Entertainment Weekly film critic Owen Gleiberman praised the film's usage of 3-D in all "its breathtaking spatial and emotional possibilities"; he gave a rating of A−. 

Both Roger Ebert of The Chicago Sun-Times and A. O. Scott of At The Movies felt that character and story development had been sidelined in favour of the visual spectacle. Ebert criticised the lengthy "aerial battles between tamed dragons and evil ones", but did note that "[the film] is bright, good-looking, and has high energy". Similarly, Scott commended the cinematography, observing that the "swooping and soaring [was] worth the price of a ticket." Rolling Stone film critic Peter Travers, giving it three out of four stars, wrote that the film "works enough miracles of 3-D animation to charm your socks off." 

Roger Moore of The Orlando Sentinel, who gave the film 2½ stars out of 4, felt that the film's inclusion of more dramatic subject matter, instead of more comedic themes, was to the detriment of the film, making it a "waste of a funny book, some very funny actors and some darned witty animation." Village Voice film critic Ella Taylor also gave a more negative review of the film, describing it as an "adequate but unremarkable animated tale". Kyle Smith of the New York Post gave the film two stars out of four stars, describing it as, "Avatar for simpletons."

Accolades

Sequels and franchise 

The film was followed by two sequels, How to Train Your Dragon 2 (2014), and How to Train Your Dragon: The Hidden World (2019). Five post-movie short films were released: Legend of the Boneknapper Dragon (2010), Book of Dragons (2011), Gift of the Night Fury (2011), Dawn of the Dragon Racers (2014) and How to Train Your Dragon: Homecoming (2019).

A television series based on the film premiered on Cartoon Network in Autumn 2012. Jay Baruchel, America Ferrera, Christopher Mintz-Plasse, and T. J. Miller reprise their roles as Hiccup, Astrid, Fishlegs, and Tuffnut. The series, set between the first and second film, follows Hiccup and his friends as they learn more about dragons, discover new ones, teach others to feel comfortable around them, adapt traditions within the village to fit their new friends and battle against enemies as they explore new worlds.

An action adventure video game released by Activision, called How to Train Your Dragon, was released for the Wii, Xbox 360, PS3 and Nintendo DS gaming consoles. It is loosely based on the film and was released on March 23, 2010. In addition, School of Dragons, a 3D free-to-play MMO, was released on July 17, 2013, at the San Diego Comic-Con. The game is available for PC, Android and iOS.

HarperCollins Children's Books published a storybook version of the film in 2010. The story was adapted by Rennie Brown while the illustrations were painted by Michael Koelsch.

How to Train Your Dragon Arena Spectacular is an arena show adaptation of the first film featuring 24 animatronic dragons, acrobats and projections. It premiered on March 2, 2012, in Melbourne, Australia.

A live-action reboot was announced to be in development. It will be produced by Marc Platt Productions and distributed by Universal Pictures, with DeBlois set to return to write and direct. It is scheduled for release on March 14, 2025.

Notes

References

External links 
 
 
 
 

2010 3D films
2010 animated films
2010 comedy films
2010 computer-animated films
2010 films
2010s American animated films
2010s children's animated films
2010s fantasy comedy films
3D animated films
American children's animated adventure films
American children's animated comedy films
American children's animated drama films
American children's animated fantasy films
American computer-animated films
American fantasy comedy films
American action drama films
Animated films about dragons
Animated films about friendship
Animated films based on children's books
Best Animated Feature Annie Award winners
Dragons in popular culture
DreamWorks Animation animated films
2010s English-language films
Films about amputees
Films adapted into television shows
Films based on British novels
Films directed by Chris Sanders
Films directed by Dean DeBlois
Films produced by Bonnie Arnold
Films scored by John Powell
Films set in the Viking Age
Films set on fictional islands
Films set in Scandinavia
Films with screenplays by Chris Sanders
Films with screenplays by Dean DeBlois
Films with screenplays by William Davies
High fantasy films
How to Train Your Dragon
IMAX films
Paramount Pictures animated films
Prosthetics in fiction
Children's comedy-drama films